In atmospheric radiation, Chandrasekhar's X- and Y-function appears as the solutions of problems involving diffusive reflection and transmission, introduced by the Indian American astrophysicist Subrahmanyan Chandrasekhar. The Chandrasekhar's X- and Y-function  defined in the interval , satisfies the pair of nonlinear integral equations

where the characteristic function  is an even polynomial in  generally satisfying the condition

If the equality is satisfied in the above condition, it is called conservative case, otherwise non-conservative. These functions are related to Chandrasekhar's H-function as

 

and also

Approximation
The  and  can be approximated up to nth order as

where  are the quadrature weights given by

Properties

  For conservative case, this integral property reduces to 
If the abbreviations  for brevity are introduced, then we have a relation stating  In the conservative, this reduces to 
For conservative case, the solutions are not unique. If  are solutions of the original equation, then so are these two functions , where  is an arbitrary constant.

See also
Chandrasekhar's H-function

References

Special functions
Integral equations
Scattering
Scattering, absorption and radiative transfer (optics)